Scratch Acid is the self-titled debut by the Austin, Texas noise rock band Scratch Acid. It was only released on vinyl, but now can be found as the first 8 tracks on the compilation album The Greatest Gift.

Kurt Cobain consistently put the album in his "favorite albums" lists in his Journals.

Scratch Acid reached #26 in the UK Indie Chart.

Track listing

Chart positions

Personnel 
Scratch Acid
Brett Bradford – guitar
David Wm. Sims – bass guitar
Rey Washam – drums, string arrangement on "Owner's Lament"
David Yow – vocals
Production and additional personnel
Stacey Cloud – production
Kerry Crafton – engineering
Mark Todd – illustrations

References

External links 
 

1984 EPs
Scratch Acid albums